Sir William de Aton, 2nd Baron Aton, of Ayton and Malton Yorkshire was a 13th–14th century English noble. He died .

Life

William was the son and heir of Gilbert de Aton of Ayton. Baron Aton was summoned to a Council in October 1359, and to Parliament on 8 January 1370 by writ. He was Sheriff of Yorkshire between 1368–70 and 1372–73. He participated in the French Wars of King Edward III of England. He died , his son and heir William died in his minority, thus the Barony fell into abeyance between his daughters.

Marriage and issue
They are known to have had the following issue:
William de Aton, died before 1388, without legitimate issue.
Anastasia de Aton, married Edward St. John. 
Katherine de Aton, married Ralph de Eure of Witton
Elizabeth de Aton, married firstly William Playce and secondly John Conyers of Sockburn

Citations

References

Year of birth unknown
1388 deaths
Barons Aton
People from the East Riding of Yorkshire